Utsayantha may refer to the following locations in the U.S. State of New York:

 Utsayantha Lake
 Utsayantha Mountain